Brian Backer (born December 5, 1956) is an American former actor who has starred in film and on television. He is best known for his role in the 1982 hit comedy film Fast Times at Ridgemont High as shy teenager Mark "Rat" Ratner. He appeared in the 1985 comedy film Moving Violations as Scott Greeber and the 1987 comedy film Police Academy 4: Citizens on Patrol as Arnie.

Backer's primary television role was on the soap opera Santa Barbara in 1990 as A. Bartlett Congdon. He has made guest appearances on such shows as Charles in Charge, Gimme a Break! and Growing Pains.

Backer won the 1981 Tony Award for Best Performance by a Featured Actor in a Play, the Drama Desk Award for Outstanding Featured Actor in a Play, and the Theatre World Award for Woody Allen's The Floating Light Bulb, in which he portrayed an Allen-like protagonist.

Early life
Backer grew up in Brooklyn.

Filmography 

 The Burning (1981) as Alfred 
 Fast Times at Ridgemont High (1982) as Mark "Rat" Ratner
 Talk to Me (1984) as Men's Store Salesman
 Moving Violations (1985) as Scott Greeber
 The Money Pit (1986) as Ethan
 Gimme a Break! (1986) as Tyler (episode: The Purse Snatcher)
 Police Academy 4: Citizens on Patrol (1987) as Arnie
 Perry Mason: The Case of the Lethal Lesson (1989) as Eugene
 Steel and Lace (1991) as Norman
 A Clown in Babylon (1999) as Blake
 Loser (2000) as Doctor
 Marie and Bruce (2004) as Waiter
 Vamps (2012) as Middle-Aged Guy/Dentist

References

External links 
 
 
 

1956 births
Living people
Male actors from New York City
American male film actors
American male soap opera actors
American male television actors
Drama Desk Award winners
People from Brooklyn
Tony Award winners